Tatu Miettunen (born 24 April 1995) is a Finnish professional footballer who plays as a central defender for Finnish premier division club Ilves.

External links
 
  Profile at Veikkausliiga's website

1995 births
People from Mänttä-Vilppula
Living people
Finnish footballers
Finland under-21 international footballers
Association football defenders
FC Ilves players
Ykkönen players
Kakkonen players
Veikkausliiga players
Sportspeople from Pirkanmaa